Maliyan or Malian or Melyan or Malyan may refer to:
 Malyan, Fars
 Malian, Hamadan
 Maliyan, Lorestan

Maliyan is a name of Jonsar tribal family in Uttarakhand, India.